Huya (in Wayuu: Juyá, pronounced ) is the name of the rain god of the Wayuu people of Venezuela and Colombia.

The minor planet 38628 Huya is named after this figure.

References 
 

Indigenous peoples in Venezuela
Indigenous peoples in Colombia
Wayuu people